Timothy I or Timotheus I (? – 1 April 518) was a Christian priest who was appointed Patriarch of Constantinople by the Byzantine emperor Anastasius I in 511.

Early career
Timothy was Christian priest and keeper of the ornaments of the cathedral.  Two liturgical innovations are attributed to him, the prayers on Good Friday at the church of the Virgin and the recital of the Nicene Creed at every service, although the last is also ascribed to Peter the Fuller.  The British historian F. H. Blackburne Daniel considered him to be a man of bad character, as Timothy allegedly adopted the Non-Chalcedonian doctrines out of ambition rather than conviction.

Patriarch of Constantinople
He sent circular letters to all the bishops, which he requested them to subscribe and assent to the deposition of Macedonius. Some assented to both, others neither, while others subscribed to the letters but refused to assent to the deposition. Certain Non-Chalcedonians, such as John Niciota, Patriarch of Alexandria, whose name he had inserted in the diptychs, at first stood aloof from him, because, though he accepted the Henotikon, he did not reject the Council of Chalcedon, and for the same reason Flavian II of Antioch and Elias of Jerusalem at first communicated with him.

Timothy was appointed Patriarch of Constantinople by the Roman Emperor Anastasius I in 511, the day after Macedonius was deposed as patriarch.

When Severus of Antioch became Patriarch of Antioch, he assembled a synod which condemned that council, after which act Severus communicated with him. Timothy sent the decrees of his synod to Jerusalem, where Elias refused to receive them. Timothy then incited Anastasius to depose him. He also induced the emperor to persecute the clergy, monks, and laity who adhered to Macedonius, many of whom were banished to the Oasis in the Thebaid. His emissaries to Alexandria anathematized from the pulpit the council of Chalcedon. Within a year of his accession Timothy directed that the Ter Sanctus should be recited with the addition of "Who was crucified for us", which led to disturbances in two churches, in which many were slain over November 4 and 5, and to a terrible riot the following day which nearly caused the deposition of the Emperor Anastasius.

Timothy died on 5 April 517.

References

Attribution
 cites
Victor of Tonnenna, Chronicle
Marcellinus Comes, Chronicle
Theodoret, Orations ii. 28, 29, 30, 32, 33
Evagrius Scholasticus iii. 33
Theophanes, Chronicle
Tillemont, Mém. eccl. xvi. 691, 698, 728.

523 deaths
6th-century patriarchs of Constantinople
Year of birth unknown